St. Jacobi is a Lutheran church and parish in Werther, North Rhine-Westphalia, Germany. The present building was begun in the 14th century, and was expanded in 1876. The parish became Lutheran in 1570.

History 
The location of Werther appeared as "Wartera" first in a document before 1009. A church was first mentioned in 1312. Archeological research below the church found remnants of a building from the 9th century, described as a simple building without tower, surrounded by a cemetery.

The nave of the present church was begun in the 14th century in Gothic style, with a ribbed vault over consoles and semicircular wall templates. The church was dedicated to Jakobus der Ältere, as a document from 1748 supports.

In 1570, Werther and its church became Lutheran. The building was expanded in 1876/77 by a transept and a choir, following designs by A. Hartmann in Gothic Revival style. He decorated the south transept with a display facade (Schaufassade). The transepts have galleries. The stained-glass choir windows were created by the Königlichen Institut für Glasmalerei (Royal Institute for Stained Glass) in Berlin in 1878, the central one being a donation by the Prussian King. In 1981, the historic interior of the late 19th century was restored.

The foundation of the west tower was dated in the 13th century, while the upper tower was added in 1876/77. It is the highest building in Werther, dominating the skyline. The parish belongs to the Halle district of the Evangelische Kirche von Westfalen. It took until 2009 to find confirmation in the archives that the original dedication was to Jakobus the Elder (James the Great), and not to Jakobus the Younger (James, son of Alphaeus).

References

Further reading 
 Lobbedey, Uwe u. Neugebauer, Manfred, Die Ausgrabung in der ev.-luth. Kirche in Werther, in: Westfalen 61 (1983) 1, pp. 175–188.

External links 

 
 St.-Jacobi-Kirche Werther architektur-bildarchiv.de
 Ev. St. Jacobi Kirche in Werther (Westf.) outdooractive.com

14th-century churches in Germany